Bazzar is a touring show by Cirque du Soleil that premiered on 14 November 2018 in Mumbai, India. It is the company's 43rd production, and its first show to perform in India. From India, it moved to Riyadh in Saudi Arabia.

The show was designed to target the Indian and African market.

References

Cirque du Soleil touring shows